The Daraa offensive ("Operation Southern Storm" or "Aasefat al-Janoub") was a rebel operation in the Daraa Governorate, during the Syrian Civil War. It was led by the Southern Front of the Free Syrian Army and also included the Army of Conquest "southern sector", of which the Al-Qaeda-linked al-Nusra Front and Ahrar al-Sham are part of, against Syrian government forces defending Daraa city and the surrounding towns.

The offensive

Repulsion of initial assault

Prior to 25 June 2015, Syrian government administration had been evacuated from Daraa much the same way as they had before the Second Battle of Idlib, and the Southern Storm command declared the Damascus–Daraa road a "closed military zone" to try to stop supplies and reinforcements getting to soldiers in Daraa.

The offensive, which was planned by the Free Syrian Army and involved a new "higher central operations room", began with the FSA and other rebel groups (54 in total) storming Dara’a Al-Balad District and the Al-Manasheer District of Daraa city in the early morning. Rebels also attacked the town of Ghazleh. The Syrian Army responded by dropping at least 60 barrel bombs on rebel positions. Rebels advanced towards the western entrance of Daraa and captured five checkpoints near the national hospital and Air Force Intelligence building, but were reportedly pushed back by government forces around Dara’a Al-Balad and Al-Manasheer. The rebel attack on the Damascus–Daraa highway was also reportedly repelled.

Mohammed al-Asfar, a 19-year-old Al Jazeera cameraman, was killed by shelling during fighting on 26 June. By this point, opposition activists claimed that rebel forces had made further advances, capturing the headquarters of the State Security and the Air Force Intelligence branch, which allegedly left them in control of 85% of Daraa city. However, two days later, although pro-government Al-Masdar News acknowledged that the rebels achieved some success at the town of ‘Itman, north of the city, and inside the Industrial District, it stated that many of these gains had been reversed. In addition, days later, a commander who was a member of the rebel media office confirmed opposition media had exaggerated rebel gains and described the announcement that wide areas of Daraa were captured, as well as the coming of the battle days before it was launched, as "media chaos and publishing [of] inaccurate news" which the offensive's operation room could not restrain.

On 27 June, the operation room of the "Southern Storm" battle was attacked by Islamist gunmen, resulting in several injuries and the withdrawal of the attacked rebel factions from the battlefield. That government troops managed to repel the major rebel assault on the provincial capital stood in stark contrast to a string of setbacks they had suffered in previous months.

Interlude
As of 2 July, the rebels had failed to make any significant progress. Fighting was reported in the outskirts of Itman, in an attempt to cut the Syrian Army's supply route, with the Air Force conducting airstrikes and the Damascus-Daraa highway still fully held by the Syrian Army. The following day, it was reported that the lack of advances was due to the coordination between the Southern Front and the Army of Conquest in the area being hampered by a lack of cohesion. This stemmed from the FSA's First Army refusing to align itself with the al-Nusra Front. The Southern Front's spokesman stated that they sought to exclude al-Nusra from the offensive, which in turn caused al-Nusra to respond in kind, causing problems.

Attempted renewal of the offensive
On 8 July, the rebels reportedly renewed their offensive. However, as of 10 July, the rebels had failed to make much headway in the face of stiff resistance by the Army, backed up by heavy air strikes on rebel positions.

Aftermath
On 13 August, the rebels took Tal Za'tar hill, near the western suburbs of the city, but it was reportedly recaptured by the Army the next day.

References

Military operations of the Syrian civil war in 2015
Daraa Governorate in the Syrian civil war
Military operations of the Syrian civil war involving the Syrian government
Military operations of the Syrian civil war involving the al-Nusra Front
Military operations of the Syrian civil war involving the Free Syrian Army